Boswellia dalzielii is a tree species in the genus Boswellia found in Africa. The bark of this plant is used in traditional medicines.

Gallic and protocatechuic acids were isolated as the main antibacterial and antioxidant principles of the stem bark of B. dalzielii. 4'-Methoxy-(E)-resveratrol 3-O-rutinoside, incensole and b-sitosterol were also isolated.

References

External links 

dalzielii
Flora of Benin
Flora of Burkina Faso
Flora of Cameroon
Flora of Ivory Coast
Flora of Ghana
Flora of Nigeria
Flora of Togo
Plants used in traditional African medicine